It's You I Want is a 1936 British comedy film directed by Ralph Ince and starring Seymour Hicks, Marie Lohr and Hugh Wakefield. It was made at Beaconsfield Studios. The film's sets were designed by Norman Arnold.

Cast
 Seymour Hicks as Victor Delaney 
 Marie Lohr as Constance Gilbert 
 Hugh Wakefield as Otto Gilbert 
 Jane Carr as Melisande 
 Lesley Wareing as Anne Vernon 
 H.G. Stoker as Braille 
 Gerald Barry as Maj. Entwhistle 
 Ronald Waters as Jimmy Watts 
 Dorothy Hamilton as Lady Maureen

References

Bibliography
 Low, Rachael. Filmmaking in 1930s Britain. George Allen & Unwin, 1985.
 Wood, Linda. British Films, 1927-1939. British Film Institute, 1986.

External links

1936 films
British comedy films
British black-and-white films
1936 comedy films
1930s English-language films
Films directed by Ralph Ince
Films shot at Beaconsfield Studios
Films produced by Herbert Smith (producer)
1930s British films